The Never Ending Tour is the popular name for Bob Dylan's endless touring schedule since June 7, 1988.

Background
The tour started off with 14 shows in Japan including a 7 show run at Zepp Tokyo before moving on to a concert in South Korea, the first he had performed there.

After completing the Asian tour Dylan and the band performed a European Summer Tour comprising 27 dates including his only United Kingdom performance of the year at the Hop Farm Festival in Kent. The European tour finished the next day in Limerick, Ireland.

After touring Europe Dylan returned home to the United States for a month-long summer tour beginning on August 4 in Austin, Texas and ending on September 4 in Seattle, Washington and Bumbershoot. John Mellencamp was Dylan's co-headliner for approximately half of the shows.

The fall tour was mainly a tour of College venues and some smaller theaters such as the Murat Theater in Indianapolis. The tour came to a close in Mashantucket, Connecticut on November 27 after 102 shows.

Opening acts
Shooter Jennings (Oklahoma City, Oklahoma)
The Dough Rollers (Kansas City, Missouri / Lincoln Nebraska / Billings Montana / Casper, Wyoming / Jackson, Wyoming / Oakland, California)
John Mellencamp (Lincoln, Nebraska / Billings, Montana / Casper, Wyoming / Las Vegas, Nevada / Ontario, California / Bend, Oregon – Yakima, Washington)

Tour dates

Tour band
Bob Dylan – Vocals, Harmonica, Organ, Guitar
Charlie Sexton – Guitar
Stu Kimball – Rhythm Guitar
George Recelli – Drums, Percussion
Tony Garnier – Bass
Donnie Herron – violin, electric mandolin, pedal steel, lap steel

Notes

References

External links

BobLinks – Comprehensive log of concerts and set lists
Bjorner's Still on the Road – Information on recording sessions and performances

Bob Dylan concert tours
2010 concert tours